Miss USA 2000 was the 49th Miss USA pageant, held at The Grand Palace, in Branson, Missouri on February 4, 2000. At the conclusion of the final competition, Lynnette Cole of Tennessee was crowned by outgoing titleholder Kimberly Pressler of New York.

The pageant was held in Branson for the second and final time, at the 4,000 seat Grand Palace Theatre, and was the last pageant held in February. Lynnette Cole becomes the fifth former Miss Teen USA state delegate to win or inherit the Miss USA title in six years and the third to win it outright.

Carson Daly hosted the event for the only time, and color commentary was added for the third time by Miss USA 1996 Ali Landry and Julie Moran.  Entertainment was provided by Christina Aguilera, Lou Bega, Brian McKnight and Mark Wills.

Results

Placements

Special awards

Final competition scores

 Winner
 First Runner-Up
 Second Runner-Up
 Top 5 Finalist
(#) Ranking in the competition

Delegates
The Miss USA 2000 delegates were:

 Alabama – Jina Mitchell
 Alaska – Laurie Miller
 Arizona – Heather Keckler
 Arkansas – Whitney Moore
 California – Rebekah Keller
 Colorado – Tiani Jones
 Connecticut – Sallie Toussaint
 Delaware – Jennifer Behm
 District of Columbia – Juel Casamayor
 Florida – Kristin Ludecke
 Georgia – Patti Dunn
 Hawaii – Michelle Kaplan
 Idaho – Brooke Jennifer Gambrell
 Illinois – Constance Stoetzer
 Indiana – Kristal Wile
 Iowa – Jensie Grigsby
 Kansas – Tiffany Meyer
 Kentucky – Jolene Youngster
 Louisiana – Jennifer Dupont
 Maine – Jennifer Hunt
 Maryland – Christie Davis
 Massachusetts – Rosalie Allain
 Michigan – Jill Dobson
 Minnesota – Paige Swenson
 Mississippi – Angie Carpenter
 Missouri – Denette Roderick
 Montana – Brandi Bjorklund
 Nebraska – Valarie Cook
 Nevada – Alicia Carnes
 New Hampshire – Bridget Jane Vezina
 New Jersey – Michelle Graci
 New Mexico – Christina Ortega
 New York – Carrie Tucker
 North Carolina – Portia Johnson
 North Dakota – Amie Hoffner
 Ohio – Cheya R. Watkins
 Oklahoma – Amanda Penix
 Oregon – Elizabeth Heitmanek
 Pennsylvania – Angela Patla
 Rhode Island – Heidi St. Pierre
 South Carolina – Lisa Rabon
 South Dakota – Vanessa Short Bull
 Tennessee – Lynnette Cole
 Texas – Heather Ogilvie
 Utah – Keri Hatfield
 Vermont – Katie Bolton
 Virginia – Crystal Jones
 Washington – Jamie Kern
 West Virginia – Tara Wilson
 Wisconsin – Samantha Picha
 Wyoming – Rebecca Smith

Historical significance 
 Tennessee wins competition for the first time and surpasses its previous highest placement from the previous year. Also becoming in the 27th state who does it for the first time.
 New Hampshire earns the 1st runner-up position for the first time and surpasses its previous highest placement in 1980, becoming its highest placement ever at the pageant.
 Alabama earns the 2nd runner-up position for the fourth time. The last time it placed this was in 1960. 
 Georgia finishes as Top 5 for the third time. The last time it placed this was in 1992. Also had its highest placement since 1993. 
 Kansas finishes as Top 5 for the second time. The last time it placed this was in 1992. Also had its highest placement since 1996.
 States that placed in semifinals the previous year were Michigan, New York, South Carolina and Tennessee.
 Michigan placed for the third consecutive year. 
 New York, South Carolina and Tennessee made their second consecutive placement. 
 Alabama last placed in 1997.
 Kansas last placed in 1996.
 Georgia and Iowa last placed in 1993.
 Colorado last placed in 1989.
 New Hampshire last placed in 1980.
 California and Virginia break an ongoing streak of placements since 1998.

Crossovers
Fourteen delegates had previously competed in either the Miss Teen USA, Miss America or Miss World pageants or would later compete in one of them. 

Delegate who previously competed at Miss World was:
Sallie Toussaint (Connecticut) - US representative to Miss World in 1997 (Top 10 Semifinalist at Miss World 1997)

Delegates who had previously held a Miss Teen USA state title were:
Lynnette Cole (Tennessee) - Miss Tennessee Teen USA 1995 (Top 6 Finalist at Miss Teen USA 1995)
Tiffany Meyer (Kansas) - Miss Missouri Teen USA 1994 (Top 6 Finalist at Miss Teen USA 1994)
Amanda Penix (Oklahoma) - Miss Oklahoma Teen USA 1997 (Top 6 Finalist at Miss Teen USA 1997)
Angie Carpenter (Mississippi) - Miss Mississippi Teen USA 1994 (Top 12 Semifinalist at Miss Teen USA 1994)
Heather Keckler (Arizona) - Miss Arizona Teen USA 1992
Paige Swenson (Minnesota) - Miss Minnesota Teen USA 1994
Jennifer Lyn Hunt (Maine) - Miss Maine Teen USA 1994
Alicia Carnes (Nevada) - Miss Nevada Teen USA 1995
Laurie Miller (Alaska) - Miss Alaska Teen USA 1997
Jennifer Dupont (Louisiana) - Miss Louisiana Teen USA 1998 (Dupont competed in the Miss USA pageant less than two years after competing at Miss Teen USA. The youngest in the competition, in 2004 she became a Triple Crown winner, for holding state titles for Miss Teen USA, Miss USA and Miss America)

Delegates who had previously held a Miss America state title or would later win one were:
Rebekah Keller (California) - Miss California 1997 (4th runner-up and Preliminary Swimsuit award at Miss America 1998)
Jennifer Dupont (Louisiana) - Miss Louisiana 2004 (1st runner-up and Preliminary Swimsuit Award at Miss America 2005)
Brooke Gambrell (Idaho) - Miss Idaho 1995
Kristen Ludecke (Florida) - Miss Florida 1995
Cheya Watkins (Ohio) - Miss Ohio 1998
Vanessa Shortbull (South Dakota) - Miss South Dakota 2002

See also
Miss Universe 2000

External links
Miss USA official website 

2000
2000 beauty pageants
February 2000 events in the United States
2000 in Missouri